Crowea angustifolia is a flowering plant in the family Rutaceae, and is endemic to the south-west of Western Australia.

Description 
The leaves are thin, glabrous, linear to broad elliptic, or egg-shaped with the narrower end towards the base. Flowering occurs from September to December.

Taxonomy
Crowea angustifolia was first formally described by James Edward Smith in 1808 from a specimen collected by "Mr Menzies near King George's Sound".
The specific epithet (angustifolia) is derived from the Latin words, angustus meaning "narrow" and folium meaning "leaf".

Two varieties are recognised by the Australian Plant Census:
C. angustifolia Sm. var. angustifolia Benth.(1863) that has more or less linear leaves and usually pink flowers;
C. angustifolia var. platyphylla Benth. which has broader, more egg-shaped leaves and usually white flowers.

In his original paper describing the two varieties, Paul Wilson named them var. angustifolia and var. dentata, but later corrected the name of the second variety to var. platyphylla.

Distribution and habitat 
The species is endemic to the extreme south western corner of Western Australia, in the Jarrah Forest, Swan Coastal Plain and Warren biogeographic regions growing on sandy soils, gravel, granite, ridge tops, slopes and outcrops.

References 

Sapindales of Australia
Eudicots of Western Australia
Endemic flora of Western Australia
Zanthoxyloideae